Mount Mace is a mountain at , in the All-Blacks Nunataks, west of the Churchill Mountains of Antarctica. It was named in honor of Chris Mace, Chair of the Antarctica New Zealand Board from its establishment in 1996 until April 2003.

References

Mountains of Oates Land